A Beard of Stars is the fourth studio album by English psychedelic folk band Tyrannosaurus Rex, and their last before changing their name to T. Rex. It was released in March 1970 by record label Regal Zonophone.

Music 

A Beard of Stars was the act's first album with Marc Bolan's new musical partner Mickey Finn and featured Bolan on vocals, guitar, organ and bass and Finn on percussion and bass. It was notable for being the first album on which Bolan used an electric guitar, although that instrument had first appeared on the band's 1969 single "King of the Rumbling Spires"/"Do You Remember". According to Mark Deming of AllMusic, A Beard of Stars "was the turning point where Marc Bolan began evolving from an unrepentant hippie into the full-on swaggering rock star he would be within a couple of years, though for those not familiar with his previous work, it still sounds like the work of a man with his mind plugged into the age of lysergic enchantment".

Four tracks from this album, including "Great Horse", were salvaged from spring 1969 sessions for a fourth album with original percussionist Steve Peregrin Took in the wake of "King of the Rumbling Spires". These four tracks were overdubbed for release by Finn, Bolan and Visconti. A further four tracks from the Took sessions – rejected for the final album – subsequently surfaced on various compilations, three ("Once Upon the Seas of Abyssinia", "Blessed Wild Apple Girl", "Demon Queen") in Bolan's lifetime, the fourth ("Ill Starred Man") posthumously.

Release 

A Beard of Stars was released in March 1970 by Regal Zonophone in the UK and Blue Thumb in the US. It reached No. 21 in the UK Albums Chart.

Reception 

In a retrospective review, AllMusic praised the album as a "Grand Transformation. A Beard of Stars holds on to the charm of Tyrannosaurus Rex's early work while letting Bolan's natural charisma and rock moves finally take hold, and it's a unique and very pleasing entry in their catalog".

Track listing

Personnel
Tyrannosaurus Rex
Marc Bolan - acoustic and electric guitars, lead vocals, chord organ, bass
Mickey Finn - Moroccan clay drums, backing vocals, tabla, finger cymbals, bass
Technical
 Malcolm Toft - engineer
 Tony Visconti - piano,  producer

Charts

References

External links 

 

T. Rex (band) albums
1970 albums
Albums produced by Tony Visconti
Regal Zonophone Records albums
Blue Thumb Records albums
Albums recorded at Trident Studios